The Mid-Cities is a suburban region filling the 30-mile (48 km) span between Dallas and Fort Worth.  These communities include the cities of Arlington, Bedford, Colleyville, Coppell, Euless, Flower Mound, Grand Prairie, Grapevine, Haltom City, Hurst, Irving, Keller, Lewisville, Mansfield, North Richland Hills, Richland Hills, Southlake, and Watauga.

Cities
The list features cities that are considered part of the Mid-Cities. Most of these communities are predominantly in Tarrant County, with minor exceptions lying in Dallas and Denton counties. Some of these communities with a population over 100,000 are considered principal or major cities, despite being between Dallas and Fort Worth.

Arlington (Tarrant County)
Irving (Dallas County)
North Richland Hills
Haltom City
Watauga
Keller
Colleyville
Southlake
Hurst
Bedford
Euless
Grapevine
Lewisville (Denton County)
Flower Mound (Denton County)
Coppell (Dallas County) 
Richland Hills
Dalworthington Gardens
Pantego
Grand Prairie (Dallas County) 
Mansfield

Transportation in the Mid-Cities

Airports
 DFW International Airport
 Grand Prairie Municipal Airport
 Arlington Municipal Airport

Highways

Rail
Trinity Railway Express
TEXRail
 DART Orange Line

Major shopping centers in the Mid-Cities
 Grapevine Mills
 Irving Mall
 North East Mall
 Parks Mall
 Southlake Town Center

Entertainment in the Mid-Cities

Major sports

Arlington hosts two major teams. The Texas Rangers baseball team have played at Arlington Stadium from 1972 to 1993, at Globe Life Park in Arlington from 1994 to 2019, and at Globe Life Field since 2020. Meanwhile, the Dallas Cowboys football team has played at the Texas Stadium in Irving from 1971 to 2008 and at the AT&T Stadium in Arlington since 2009.

The International Bowling Campus, which houses the United States Bowling Congress, International Bowling Museum and the International Bowling Hall of Fame, is also located in Arlington.

The Four Seasons Resort and Club Dallas at Las Colinas hosts the Byron Nelson Championship, an annual PGA Tour golf tournament. The Las Colinas Country Club hosts the LPGA Tour's Volunteers of America Texas Shootout each spring as well.

Other sports teams in the Mid-Cities are:

 Grand Prairie AirHogs
 Lone Star Brahmas
 Texas Jr. Brahmas
 Dallas Derby Devils
 Vitesse Dallas

Amusement parks
 Six Flags
 Hurricane Harbor
 NRH2O
Great Wolf Lodge
Epic Waters Indoor Water Park

Notable museums
Ripley's Believe It or Not!

Gambling
 Lone Star Park

Venues
 Texas Trust CU Theatre at Grand Prairie
 Irving Convention Center at Las Colinas
 Toyota Music Factory

Education in the Mid-Cities

Colleges/universities
 North Lake College (Irving)
 Dallas Baptist University (Grand Prairie)
 Brookhaven College
 Tarrant County College (Arlington and Hurst) 
 Dallas Christian College
 University of Dallas (Irving)
 University of Texas at Arlington
 Arlington Baptist College
 Brown Mackie College

High schools
This list features high schools that serve the Mid-Cities communities. Some of the campuses' city limits are within either Dallas or Fort Worth, examples such as Keller ISD have a significant amount of their high school campuses predominantly in Fort Worth city limits, despite being based in Keller.

 Arlington ISD
 Arlington High School
 Bowie High School (Arlington, TX)
 Lamar High School (Arlington, Texas)
 Martin High School (Arlington, TX)
 Sam Houston High School (Arlington, Texas)
 Seguin High School (Arlington, Texas)
 Birdville ISD
 Birdville High School (North Richland Hills, TX)
 Haltom High School
 Richland High School
 Carroll ISD
 Carroll High School (Southlake, TX)
 Carrollton-Farmers Branch ISD
 Ranchview High School(Irving Texas)
 Coppell ISD
 Coppell High School
 Grand Prairie ISD
 Grand Prairie High School
 South Grand Prairie High School
 Grapevine-Colleyville ISD
 Colleyville Heritage High School
 Grapevine High School
 Hurst-Euless-Bedford ISD
 L. D. Bell High School (Hurst, TX)
 Trinity High School
 Irving ISD
 Irving High School
 Jack E. Singley Academy (Irving, Texas)
 MacArthur High School (Irving, Texas)
 Nimitz High School (Irving, Texas)
 Keller ISD
 Central High School (Fort Worth, TX)
 Fossil Ridge High School (Fort Worth, TX)
 Keller High School (Keller, Texas)
 Timber Creek High School (Fort Worth, TX)
 Mansfield ISD
 Mansfield High School (Mansfield, Texas)
 Mansfield Summit High School (Arlington, Texas)
 Mansfield Timberview High School (Arlington, Texas)
 Mansfield Legacy High School (Mansfield, Texas)
 Mansfield Lake Ridge High School (Mansfield, Texas)
 Northwest ISD
 Byron Nelson High School (Trophy Club, TX)

References

Dallas–Fort Worth metroplex